George William Saul Howson MA (8 August 1860 – 7 January 1919) was an English schoolmaster and writer, notable as the reforming headmaster of Gresham's School from 1900 to 1919.

Early life
Howson was one of the four sons of William Howson of Settle, author of An Illustrated Guide to the Curiosities of Craven (1850), and Headmaster of Penrith School; and the grandson of the Reverend J. Howson, second master of Giggleswick School. He was himself educated at Giggleswick, which he left in July 1879, and then at Merton College, Oxford. He matriculated at Oxford in 1879 and graduated BA (taking a First in the Final Honours School of Natural Science) in 1883 and MA in 1886.

All of his brothers attended Giggleswick School, Hubert Howson (born 1857) becoming a lawyer and settling in New York City, and Charles James Howson (born 1852) becoming a bank manager and Justice of the Peace at Chesterfield.

Schoolmaster

Howson's first position after leaving Oxford was as an assistant master at Newton College, in south Devon, from 1883 to 1886. He then moved to Uppingham School, where he remained for fourteen years, from 1886 until 1900, when he was appointed Headmaster of Gresham's School, Holt, continuing in post until his death in 1919.

When Howson arrived at Gresham's, a rather dusty ancient grammar school founded by Sir John Gresham, he found it in numbers much as it had been when established in 1555. In 1900, the school still occupied its original Holt town centre site and contained only forty Holt Scholars, plus seven boarders. However, Howson was appointed on the clear understanding that the school was to be enlarged, and The Journal of Education reported the two matters together: "G. W. S. Howson, science master at Uppingham School, has been appointed Headmaster of Holt Grammar School, Norfolk. The Fishmongers' Company is spending £50,000 on the erection of new buildings."

During Howson's time as headmaster, a new set of school buildings was built on an edge-of-town site on the Cromer Road, transforming the school and quadrupling its population. The first such new buildings, designed by the architect Sir John Simpson, were opened by Field Marshal Sir Evelyn Wood on 30 September 1903. These consisted of School House (renamed Howson's in 1919, after Howson's death) and the main classrooms building, including a hall called Big School. More boarding houses were bought or built between 1905 and 1911. A new School Chapel was completed in 1916, during the Great War, during which one hundred Old Greshamians were killed.

The poet W. H. Auden wrote favourably of the new school's private studies for boys, its warm classrooms, magnificent library and excellent laboratories.

A portrait of Howson by his friend Sholto Johnstone Douglas hangs at Gresham's in Big School.

In Who's Who, Howson stated his recreations as riding, fives, and trout-fishing.

He died suddenly on 7 January 1919. His Executors were Charles James Howson and James Ronald Eccles. The Times said of him "Under him the school made rapid progress, especially in science teaching", and "He has been called away, as he would have wished, while in the faithful discharge of his duty. His death has left a gap which it will be well-nigh impossible to fill."

J. H. Simpson later wrote of Howson's achievements at Gresham's: 

A new school library was built in memory of Howson and opened by Field Marshal Lord Milne in June 1931. On 31 January 1932, a bronze bust of Howson by Kathleen Scott was unveiled in the library by Howson's successor, J. R. Eccles.

Author
Howson's publications include his Sermons by a Lay Headmaster, Preached at Gresham's School, 1900-1918 (Longmans, Green and Co., 1920).

See also
John Saul Howson

References

Bibliography
Simpson, James Herbert, Howson of Holt: a study in school life. 93 pp. (Sidgwick & Jackson, 1925; Cambridge Occupational Analysts Ltd., new illustrated edition, 2010)
Eccles, J. R., One Hundred Terms at Gresham's School (1934)

1860 births
1919 deaths
Alumni of Merton College, Oxford
Headmasters of Gresham's School
People educated at Giggleswick School
English educational theorists
People from Settle, North Yorkshire